The Roman Catholic Diocese of Huejutla (erected 24 November 1922) is a suffragan diocese of the Archdiocese of Tulancingo. It is centred on the Mexican city of Huejutla de Reyes, Hidalgo.

Ordinaries
José de Jesús Manríquez y Zárate (1922 - 1939) 
Manuel Jerónimo Yerena y Camarena (1940 - 1963) 
Bartolomé Carrasco Briseño (1963 - 1967) 
Sefafín Vásquez Elizalde (1968 - 1977) 
Juan de Dios Caballero Reyes (1978 - 1993) 
Salvador Martínez Pérez (1994 - 2009)
Salvador Rangel Mendoza, O.F.M. (2009 - 2015)
Jose Hirais Acosta Beltran (2016–Present)

Territorial losses

External links and references

Huejutla
Hidalgo (state)
Huejutla, Roman Catholic Diocese of
Huejutla
Huejutla